Peradayan Forest Reserve is a  nature reserve in Mukim Batu Apoi, Temburong District, Brunei.

Perdayan Forest Recreation Park's  territory is home to a variety of readily seen wildlife such as Borneo`s native Kijang (deer). The patch of level stone on Bukit Patoi's summit is used as a helipad. It takes about two hours to negotiate the  winding trek to the park.

External links
Bukit Peradayan Recreational Forest; Brunei Resources

References 

Temburong District
Protected areas of Brunei